Rikstoto Direkte is a Norwegian TV channel showing Norwegian and international horse races.

Television channels in Norway
Horse racing in Norway
2001 establishments in Norway